Satu Maijastiina Hassi (born 3 June 1951) is a Finnish politician, and former Member of the European Parliament for the Green League. She served as the Minister of Environment and Development Co-Operation in Paavo Lipponen's second cabinet between 15 April 1999 and 31 May 2002. In accordance with her party's position on the issue, she quit the cabinet in protest of the government's decision to build a fifth nuclear power plant in Finland. Hassi served as the leader of her party between 1999 and 2001. She was a member of the national parliament from 1991 to 2004; she left the parliament when she was elected to the European Parliament as the sole Finnish Green representative in the 2004 election.

In the European Parliament she was the coordinator of the Greens/EFA parliamentary group in the Committee on the Environment, Public Health and Food Safety and a vice member of the Committee on Industry, Research and Energy.

Hassi was previously a taistoist, a pro-Soviet member of the Communist Party in the 1970s. She has a licentiate in technology, has worked as an engineer in a power company and taught at Tampere University of Technology. She has published three novels, a collection of poems and several essays. She has also been co-author of a series of physics books for high school students.

Hassi is a member of the board of directors of the Worldwatch Institute and a vice chairman of the parliamentary network Globe EU. She has been granted the Golden Peacock Global Award for Environmental Leadership, Hart World Refining Fuels Policy Award and the International Award for Outstanding Contribution for Environment of the Priyadarshni Academy.

Hassi is a breast cancer survivor.

References

External links 

  Official website
 
  Satu HASSI - European Parliament

1951 births
Living people
Politicians from Helsinki
Green League politicians
Minister of the Environment of Finland
Members of the Parliament of Finland (1991–95)
Members of the Parliament of Finland (1995–99)
Members of the Parliament of Finland (1999–2003)
Members of the Parliament of Finland (2003–07)
Members of the Parliament of Finland (2015–19)
Members of the Parliament of Finland (2019–23)
Green League MEPs
MEPs for Finland 2004–2009
MEPs for Finland 2009–2014
21st-century women MEPs for Finland
Women members of the Parliament of Finland
Women government ministers of Finland
Finnish women writers
Aalto University alumni
Articles containing video clips